Mécheria (Arabic: المشرية) is a district in Naâma Province, Algeria. It was named after its capital, Mécheria.

Municipalities
The district is further divided into 3 municipalities:
Mécheria
Aïn Ben Khelil
El Biodh

 
Districts of Naâma Province